Yetenek Sizsiniz Türkiye is the local version of Got Talent, published in Turkey.

Finalists

Season 1 
 Ali Ozan Bayram (Champion)
 Yusuf Ayata
 Alican Aslan (english)
 Hakan Akdoğan
 Bilal Göregen
 Hüsnü Mirza Turan
 Emre Büyüktunç
 Kaya Adamlar
 Kaan Baybağ
 Ramazan Berkay Oral
 Mehmet Yenigün - Koray Polat
 Yunus Emre Çelik
 Hamdi Yumrukmanyağı

Season 2 
 Mustafa Sefa Bulut (Champion)
 Aref Ghafouri
 Oğuz Engin
 Kaan Gülsoy
 Türkan Kürşad
 Fatih Jackson
 Cüneyt Acar
 Cem Arman
 Kum Sanatı
 Tokio Tekkan
 Şavkar Jimnastik
 Gökalp Koçoğlu
 Kuzeyin Uşakları
 Sercan Yenice and Pascal

Season 3 
 Onur Balcı (Champion)
 Kafkas Kartalları
 Serdar Boğatekin and Lunatics
 Halit İncedayı
 Güney Cino
 Tuğberk and Alara
 İlker ve Seda
 Abdullah Talayhan
 Her Kafadan Bir Ses
 Pembe Panter 
 Ayhan ve Anıl
 Kutay Özkan ve Tarçin
 Gökdeniz Özkan

Season 4 
 Hüsnü Mirza Turan (Champion)
 Alp Ömer Didici
 Atalay Demirci
 Abidin Yurdakul
 Ali Alkan Çömlek
 Murtaza Miragazade
 Fire Storm
 İrem Okyay and Cash
 Grup Kaşıks
 Nahit Yılmaz
 Hacivat and Karagöz
 Family Group
 Hakan Çankaya
 Mehmet Çakır
 Uğur Harmankaya

External links 
 Acun Medya
 Yetenek Sizsiniz

2009 Turkish television series debuts
Turkey
Turkish television series
Turkish reality television series
2000s Turkish television series
2010s Turkish television series
Show TV original programming
Star TV (Turkey) original programming
TV8 (Turkish TV channel) original programming
Turkish television series based on British television series